Juan Domínguez (born May 18, 1980) is a Dominican former professional baseball pitcher. He played in Major League Baseball (MLB) for the Texas Rangers.

Career
Over three seasons, the right-hander appeared in 32 games for the Rangers, 17 of them as a starter, compiling an ERA of 4.60. In the 2005–06 offseason, Domínguez was dealt by Texas to the Oakland Athletics for pitcher John Rheinecker and infielder Freddie Bynum. Domínguez started the 2006 with Oakland's Triple-A squad, the Sacramento River Cats, but suffered a season-ending ankle injury in July. The Athletics released Domínguez after the end of the 2006 season.

References

External links

1980 births
Living people
Charlotte Rangers players
Dominican Republic expatriate baseball players in Mexico
Dominican Republic expatriate baseball players in the United States
Frisco RoughRiders players
Gulf Coast Rangers players
Major League Baseball pitchers
Major League Baseball players from the Dominican Republic
Mexican League baseball pitchers
Oklahoma RedHawks players
People from Sánchez Ramírez Province
Sacramento River Cats players
Saraperos de Saltillo players
Savannah Sand Gnats players
Stockton Ports players
Texas Rangers players